Veronica beccabunga, the European speedwell or brooklime, is a succulent herbaceous perennial plant belonging to the flowering plant family Plantaginaceae. It grows on the  margins of brooks and ditches in Europe, North Africa, and north and western Asia. It can be found on other continents as an introduced species. It has smooth spreading succulent branches that are often reddish, blunt oblong finely serrate leaves in opposite pairs close to the stem, and small bright blue or pink flowers with four petals.

The species name beccabunga comes from Danish bekkebunge (literally "brook bunch") or a similar source.

Medicinal usage
Brooklime was one of three traditional antiscorbutic herbs (alongside scurvy grass and watercress), used in purported remedies for scurvy. However none of these herbs are rich in vitamin C and the usual preparation by extracting of juices would have destroyed most of their content, rendering the preparations ineffectual against true scurvy.

References

External links

beccabunga
Flora of Europe
Medicinal plants
Flora of Lebanon
Plants described in 1753
Taxa named by Carl Linnaeus